Irreligion in Uganda is uncommon among Ugandans, as Christianity is the predominant faith. Only 2.9% of Ugandans claim no religion.  Most Ugandans are considered religious and there is a great stigma attached to being a non-believer.

A small group of atheists such as James Onen have set up organizations opposing witchcraft and superstitions in Uganda.

In February 2015 BiZoHa, the world's first ‘free-thinker’ orphanage, was launched in the town of Mukhoy, Kasese district in western Uganda. The campaign to start the program was primarily funded by Zoltan Istvan and Hank Pellissier.

See also
 Religion in Uganda
 Islam in Uganda
 Demographics of Uganda

References

External links
Freethought Kampala

Religion in Uganda
Uganda
Uganda